Eamin Haque Bobby, better known as Bobby Haque, is a popular Bangladeshi film actress, model and film producer. She made her acting debut in Khoj: The Search, released on 16 April 2010.Dehorokkhi (2013) helped establish her as a star in the Dhallywood film industry.

Career
Bobby started her career as a model. She made her film debut in Bangladesh in 2010 in Khoj: The Search. She next appeared in Dehorokkhi, directed by Iftakar Chowdhury. Her next film was Full and Final, starring Shakib Khan. She appeared for the first time opposite Bappy Chowdhury in Inchi Inchi Prem. In August 2015 the movie Blackmail was released.

Filmography

Television

Music video

Awards and achievements
Title winner of Miss Asia Pacific Bangladesh 2011

References

Living people
Bangladeshi film actresses
21st-century Bangladeshi actresses
1983 births